Magnetic Hill is a Canadian neighbourhood in the north-west area of Moncton, New Brunswick. Magnetic Hill is located around the intersection of Route 126 and Route 2. Magnetic Hill is partially within the community of Lutes Mountain.

History

See History of Moncton and Timeline of Moncton history

The name Magnetic Hill was taken from the area surrounding the Magnetic Hill Phenomenon.

Places of note

See also

List of neighbourhoods in Moncton
List of tallest buildings in Moncton

References 

http://www.lutzmtnheritage.ca/

Bordering communities

Neighbourhoods in Moncton